The Yakovlev Yak-77 was a planned large business or regional commuter jet. Work began in 1992, but no prototype was ever produced.

History
The Yakovlev Yak-77 was to have been a large business jet and regional commuter, considerably larger than the earlier Yakovlev Yak-48. Little information has been released about this design.

Development
Work on the Yak-77 began in 1992, the project manager being S A Yakovlev. The aircraft was to have two AE 3010/12 turbofans, uprated members of the Allison 3000 family of two-shaft turbofans, each with a takeoff rating of 4,500 kg (9,920 lb). Avionics were to have been a Collins Pro Line 4 system.

In configuration for a business jet, the aircraft would have had seating for eight in a generous cabin. Configured as a regional commuter it would have seated 32 in rows of 2+2. Streatched versions with seating for up to 70 were studied. The aircraft was to have entered production at Saratov in 1994. Certification was expected in 1996 to 1997, though no prototype was ever produced.

Specifications (Yak-77)

References

See also

Yak-077
2000s Russian airliners